Colletes simulans is a species in the family Colletidae ("cellophane or plasterer, masked, and fork-tongued bees"), in the order Hymenoptera ("ants, bees, wasps and sawflies"). The species is known generally as the "spine-shouldered cellophane bee".
It is found in North America.

References

Further reading

External links
NCBI Taxonomy Browser, Colletes simulans

Colletidae
Insects described in 1868